Bluescreen Project: The Vertical Collection (Sketches) is a studio album by Jon Hassell. It was released in France on Earshot Records on November, 1997, as a limited edition of 1000 compact discs.

Track listing

Personnel
Credits adapted from liner notes.

Musicians
 Jon Hassell – trumpet, keyboards
 Others

Technical personnel
 Jon Hassell – production
 Peter Freeman – production, mastering, mixing engineer
 Michel Redolfi - executive producer
 Jef Morlan – artwork
 F. Scott Shafer – photography

References

External links
 

1997 albums
Jon Hassell albums